1936 Lugano, provisional designation , is a carbonaceous Adeonian asteroid from the middle region of the asteroid belt, approximately 26 kilometers in diameter.

It was discovered on 24 November 1973, by Swiss astronomer Paul Wild at Zimmerwald Observatory near Bern, Switzerland. It was later named for the Swiss city of Lugano.

Classification and orbit 

Lugano is a member of the Adeona family, a large family of carbonaceous asteroids.

It orbits the Sun in the central main-belt at a distance of 2.3–3.0 AU once every 4 years and 5 months (1,599 days). Its orbit has an eccentricity of 0.14 and an inclination of 10° with respect to the ecliptic.

Physical characteristics

Spectral type 

In the SMASS classification, Lugano is a Ch-subtype, a hydrated C-type asteroid, while the Wide-field Infrared Survey Explorer (WISE) rates it as a very dark and featureless reddish P-type asteroid.

Diameter and albedo 

According to the space-based surveys carried out by the Infrared Astronomical Satellite IRAS, the Japanese Akari satellite and the NEOWISE mission of NASA's WISE telescope, Lugano measures between 23.48 and 33.7 kilometers in diameter and its surface has an albedo in the range of 0.028 to 0.1042.

The Collaborative Asteroid Lightcurve Link derives an albedo of 0.056 and a diameter of 24.6 kilometers, based on an absolute magnitude of 11.8.

Lightcurves 

Two rotational lightcurves of Lugano were obtained from photometric observations made in February 2005. The first lightcurve by French astronomer Raymond Poncy gave a rotation period of  hours with a brightness variation of 0.25 magnitude.

Naming 

The minor planet is named after the Swiss-Italian city of Lugano, located south of the Alps and known for its mild climate. During the winter half-year of 1973/74, Paul Wild discovered three more asteroids, 1935 Lucerna, 1937 Locarno and 1938 Lausanna, which he named after the Swiss cities Lucerne, Locarno and Lausanne, respectively, composing a quartet of sequentially numbered, thematically named asteroids. The official  was published by the Minor Planet Center on 1 April 1978.

References

External links 
 Asteroid Lightcurve Database (LCDB), query form (info )
 Dictionary of Minor Planet Names, Google books
 Asteroids and comets rotation curves, CdR – Observatoire de Genève, Raoul Behrend
 Discovery Circumstances: Numbered Minor Planets (1)-(5000) – Minor Planet Center
 
 

001936
Discoveries by Paul Wild (Swiss astronomer)
Named minor planets
001936
19731124